De Angelis Godo Baseball is a professional baseball team that has played in the Italian Baseball League, formerly known as Serie A1, since 2006. In 2010, the team was renamed the De Angelis North East Knights.

Sources
Baseball Reference – Italian Baseball League Encyclopedia and History

Baseball teams in Italy